Poirot (also known as Agatha Christie's Poirot) is a British mystery drama television programme that aired on ITV from 8 January 1989 to 13 November 2013. David Suchet starred as the eponymous detective, Agatha Christie's fictional Hercule Poirot. Initially produced by LWT, the series was later produced by ITV Studios. The series also aired on VisionTV in Canada and on PBS and A&E in the United States.

The programme ran for 13 series and 70 episodes in total; each episode was adapted from a novel or short story by Christie that featured Poirot, and consequently in each episode Poirot is both the main detective in charge of the investigation of a crime (usually murder) and the protagonist who is at the centre of most of the episode's action. At the programme's conclusion, which finished with "Curtain: Poirot's Last Case" (based on the 1975 novel Curtain, the final Poirot novel), every major literary work by Christie that featured the title character had been adapted.

Cast 

David Suchet was cast as the eponymous role Hercule Poirot. He was portrayed, especially in the earlier seasons, alongside Hugh Fraser as the closest friend of Poirot, Captain Arthur Hastings, as well as Pauline Moran playing Poirot’s clever secretary Felicity Lemon and Philip Jackson depicting Poirot’s longtime associate Inspector James Japp. However, towards the later seasons, other characters, such as Poirot’s English butler George played by David Yelland and a crime novelist Ariadne Oliver played by Zoë Wanamaker, feature and become prominent. Several actors have played multiple parts specific to certain episodes, including Nicholas Farrell and Beatie Edney.

Episodes

Production 
Clive Exton in partnership with producer Brian Eastman adapted the pilot. Together, they wrote and produced the first eight series, which were highly enjoyable and comfortable to watch. Exton and Eastman left Poirot after 2001, when they began work on Rosemary & Thyme. Michele Buck and Damien Timmer, who both went on to form Mammoth Screen, were behind the revamping of the series. The episodes aired from series 9 in 2003 featured a radical shift in tone from the previous series. The humour of the earlier series was downplayed with each episode being presented as serious drama and saw the introduction of gritty elements not present in the Christie stories being adapted. Recurrent motifs in the additions included drug use, sex, abortion, homosexuality, and a tendency toward more visceral imagery. Story changes were often made to present female characters in a more sympathetic or heroic light, at odds with Christie's characteristic gender neutrality. The visual style of later episodes was correspondingly different: particularly, an overall darker tone; and austere modernist or Art Deco locations and decor, widely used earlier in the series, being largely dropped in favour of more lavish settings (epitomised by the re-imagining of Poirot's home as a larger, more lavish apartment). The series logo was redesigned (the full opening title sequence had not been used since series 6 in 1996), and the main theme motif, though used often, was usually featured subtly and in sombre arrangements; this has been described as a consequence of the novels adapted being darker and more psychologically driven. However, a more upbeat string arrangement of the theme music is used for the end credits of "Hallowe'en Party", "The Clocks" and "Dead Man's Folly". In flashback scenes, later episodes also made extensive use of fisheye lens, distorted colours, and other visual effects.

Series 9–12 lack Hugh Fraser, Philip Jackson and Pauline Moran, who had appeared in the previous series (excepting series 4, where Moran is absent). Series 10 (2006) introduced Zoë Wanamaker as the eccentric crime novelist Ariadne Oliver and David Yelland as Poirot's dependable valet, George — a character that had been introduced in the early Poirot novels but was left out of the early adaptations to develop the character of Miss Lemon. The introduction of Wanamaker and Yelland's characters and the absence of the other characters is generally consistent with the stories on which the scripts were based. Hugh Fraser and David Yelland returned for two episodes of the final series (The Big Four and Curtain), with Philip Jackson and Pauline Moran returning for the adaptation of The Big Four. Zoë Wanamaker also returned for the adaptations of Elephants Can Remember and Dead Man's Folly.

Clive Exton adapted seven novels and fourteen short stories for the series, including "The ABC Murders" and "The Murder of Roger Ackroyd", which received mixed reviews from critics. Anthony Horowitz was another prolific writer for the series, adapting three novels and nine short stories, while Nick Dear adapted six novels. Comedian and novelist Mark Gatiss wrote three episodes and also guest-starred in the series, as have Peter Flannery and Kevin Elyot. Ian Hallard, who co-wrote the screenplay for "The Big Four" with Mark Gatiss, appears in the episode and also "Hallowe'en Party", which was scripted by Gatiss alone.

Florin Court in Charterhouse Square, London, was used as Poirot's fictional London residence, Whitehaven Mansions. The final episode to be filmed was "Dead Man's Folly" in June 2013 on the Greenway Estate (which was Agatha Christie's home) broadcast on 30 October 2013. Most of the locations and buildings where the episodes were shot were given fictional names.

Casting 
Suchet was recommended for the part by Christie's family, who had seen him appear as Blott in the TV adaptation of Tom Sharpe's Blott on the Landscape. Suchet, a method actor, said that he prepared for the part by reading all the Poirot novels and every short story, and copying out every piece of description about the character. Suchet told The Strand Magazine: "What I did was, I had my file on one side of me and a pile of stories on the other side and day after day, week after week, I ploughed through most of Agatha Christie's novels about Hercule Poirot and wrote down characteristics until I had a file full of documentation of the character. And then it was my business not only to know what he was like, but to gradually become him. I had to become him before we started shooting".

During the filming of the first series, Suchet almost left the production during an argument with a director, insisting that Poirot's odd mannerisms (in this case, putting a handkerchief down before sitting on a park bench) be featured; he later said "there's no question [Poirot's] obsessive-compulsive". According to many critics and enthusiasts, Suchet's characterisation is considered to be the most accurate interpretation of all the actors who have played Poirot, and the closest to the character in the books. In 2013, Suchet revealed that Christie's daughter Rosalind Hicks had told him she was sure Christie would have approved of his performance.

In 2007, Suchet spoke of his desire to film the remaining stories in the canon and hoped to achieve this before his 65th birthday in May 2011. Despite speculation of cancellation early in 2011, the remaining books were ultimately adapted into a thirteenth series, adapted in 2013 into 5 episodes, from which "Curtain" aired last on 13 November. A 2013 television special, Being Poirot, centred on Suchet's characterisation and his emotional final episode.

Development

Actors 

Alongside recurring characters, the early series featured actors who later achieved greater fame, including Sean Pertwee ("The King of Clubs", 1989; "Dead Man's Folly", 2013), Joely Richardson ("The Dream", 1989), Polly Walker ("Peril at End House", 1990), Samantha Bond ("The Adventure of the Cheap Flat", 1990), Christopher Eccleston ("One, Two, Buckle My Shoe", 1992), Hermione Norris ("Jewel Robbery at The Grand Metropolitan", 1993), Damian Lewis ("Hickory Dickory Dock", 1995), Jamie Bamber ("The Murder of Roger Ackroyd", 2000), Russell Tovey ("Evil Under the Sun", 2001), Kelly Reilly ("Sad Cypress", 2003), Emily Blunt ("Death on the Nile", 2004), Alice Eve ("The Mystery of the Blue Train", 2005), Michael Fassbender ("After the Funeral", 2006), Aiden Gillen ("Five Little Pigs", 2003), Toby Jones and Jessica Chastain ("Murder on the Orient Express", 2010), and Tom Ellis ("Dead Man's Folly", 2013).

Four Academy Award nominees have appeared in the series: Sarah Miles, Barbara Hershey, Elizabeth McGovern and Elliott Gould. Peter Capaldi, Jessica Chastain, Michael Fassbender, Lesley Manville and Vanessa Kirby went on to receive Academy Award nominations after appearing on the show. Several members of British thespian families appeared in episodes throughout the course of the series. James Fox appeared as Colonel Race in "Death on the Nile", and his older brother Edward Fox appeared as Gudgeon in "The Hollow". Three of the Cusack sisters each appeared in an episode: Niamh Cusack in "The King of Clubs", Sorcha Cusack in "Jewel Robbery at The Grand Metropolitan", and Sinéad Cusack in "Dead Man's Folly". Phyllida Law and her daughter Sophie Thompson appeared in "Hallowe'en Party". David Yelland appeared as Charles Laverton West in "Murder in the Mews" and as George for the remainder of the series from Series 10 onward, and his daughter Hannah Yelland appeared as Geraldine Marsh in "Lord Edgware Dies".

Multiple roles

Reception

Critical response 
The show is generally believed to be extremely popular among those who watched it. Agatha Christie's grandson Mathew Prichard commented: "Personally, I regret very much that she [Agatha Christie] never saw David Suchet. I think that visually he is much the most convincing and perhaps he manages to convey to the viewer just enough of the irritation that we always associate with the perfectionist, to be convincing!"

In 2008, the series was described by some critics as going "off piste", though not negatively, from its old format. It was praised for its new writers, more lavish productions, and a greater emphasis on the darker psychology of the novels. Significantly, it was noted for "Five Little Pigs" (adapted by Kevin Elyot) bringing out a homosexual subtext of the novel. Nominations for twenty BAFTAs were received between 1989 and 1991 for series 1–3.

Accolades

Home media 
In the UK, ITV Studios Home Entertainment owns the home media rights.

In Region 1, Acorn Media has the rights to series 1–6 and 11–12. Series 7–10 are distributed by A&E, a co-producer on several of them. In North America, series 1–11 are available on Netflix and Amazon Prime instant streaming service. In Region 4, Acorn Media (distributed by Reel DVD) has begun releasing the series on DVD in Australia in complete season sets. To date, they have released the first 8 series of the show. Series 1–9 and 12 are available in Spain (Region 2) on Blu-ray with Spanish and English audio tracks. Dutch FilmWorks were reported to be the first company to release series 12, in 2010.

Beginning in 2011, Acorn began issuing the series on Blu-ray discs. As of 4 November 2014, series 1 through 13 have all been issued on DVD and Blu-ray by Acorn. The A&E DVD releases of series 7 through 10 correspond to the A&E versions broadcast in America which were missing sections of the original video as originally broadcast in the United Kingdom. The Acorn releases of series 7 through 10 restore the missing video.

Being Poirot 

Being Poirot is a 50-minute ITV television documentary (2013) in which David Suchet attempts to unravel the mysterious appeal of Hercule Poirot and how he portrayed him. It was broadcast in the United Kingdom on the same evening as the final episode, "Curtain".

Suchet visits the Greenway Estate, Agatha Christie's summer home, recollecting how he met her daughter Rosalind Hicks and her husband Anthony Hicks for their approval before he began filming. He meets Christie's grandson Mathew Prichard who recounts how his grandmother found the character amongst Belgian refugees in Torquay. There's a visit to the permanent Poirot exhibition at Torquay Museum to which he presented the cane he used in the television series.

Suchet acknowledges the first stage and film adaptations of the books with actors such as Charles Laughton on the London stage in Alibi, an adaptation of The Murder of Roger Ackroyd, in 1928. Alibi was filmed in 1931 with Austin Trevor but is now lost. The oldest surviving film portrayal from 1934 was Lord Edgware Dies again with Austin Trevor portraying Poirot. Suchet notes a conscious decision was made by the film company to portray Poirot without a moustache. Films featuring Albert Finney and Peter Ustinov are also featured. Suchet reveals that he read the books and wrote down 93 notes about the character that he went on to use in his portrayal. The descriptions in the books helped him discover the voice he would use, and the rapid mincing gait.

Suchet also goes to Florin Court, a place that the production company chose to represent his home Whitehaven Mansions. There he meets first producer Brian Eastman, with whom he discusses the set that was built based on the flats, and Eastman's decision to fix the stories in 1936. Suchet also visits composer Christopher Gunning who had composed four themes for Eastman, the first being Gunning's favourite. Eastman chose the fourth after having Gunning darken the tone.

Suchet travels to Brussels, where he is feted by the police chief and mayor. He then goes to Ellezelles, which claims to be the birthplace of Poirot, and he is shown a birth certificate as proof. It says the date was 1 April, "April Fools' Day" (no year mentioned). Finally, Suchet travels on the Orient Express and recounts filming the episode "Dead Man's Folly" last at Greenway to finish on a high note.

Novels or stories not included in the series
Suchet was proud to have completed the entire Poirot canon by the time of the broadcast of the final episode, only slightly short of the target he had set himself (in a 2007 interview) of completing the entire canon before his 65th birthday.

The short stories and novellas "The Submarine Plans", "The Market Basing Mystery", "Christmas Adventure", "The Mystery of the Baghdad Chest", "The Second Gong", "The Incident of the Dog's Ball", and "Hercule Poirot and the Greenshore Folly" were not filmed in their original short story format, as Agatha Christie later rewrote these stories as novellas or novels (The Incredible Theft, Murder in the Mews, The Adventure of the Christmas Pudding, The Mystery of the Spanish Chest, Dead Man's Mirror, Dumb Witness, and Dead Man's Folly respectively) which were made into episodes.

Unlike the other Poirot short story collections, where each story was adapted into a 1-hour episode, the collection entitled The Labours of Hercules (consisting of twelve short stories linked by an initial scene-setting story and a broad running theme) was adapted into a single 2-hour film. The end result drew heavily on some of the stories; other stories contributed only minor details. The original version of "The Capture of Cerberus", unpublished until 2009, was not used at all. Also incorporated into this single film was a character with the surname Lemesurier, as a nod to the short story "The Lemesurier Inheritance", which has otherwise not been included in the Poirot series.

One other short story, "The Regatta Mystery", is not included in the Suchet series, as it is not generally considered part of the Poirot canon. First published in issue 546 of the Strand Magazine in June 1936 under the title "Poirot and the Regatta Mystery" (and illustrated by Jack M. Faulks), the story was later rewritten by Christie to change the detective from Hercule Poirot to Parker Pyne. It was as a Parker Pyne mystery that the story was first published in book format in The Regatta Mystery and Other Stories (published in the United States in 1939). Although the story is now associated with Parker Pyne, it was included in the 2008 omnibus volume Hercule Poirot: the Complete Short Stories, which was the first public association of the story with Hercule Poirot since the original Strand Magazine publication of 1936.

Aside from "Poirot and the Regatta Mystery", the one authentic Hercule Poirot story not included in any form, whole or partial, in the Agatha Christie's Poirot series is the 1930 play Black Coffee. Although it was adapted into a novel in 1998, with the permission of the Christie Estate, it was not previously available in novel format. David Suchet did give a live reading of the original play version for the Agatha Christie Theatre Company and therefore felt that he had done justice to the entire authentic canon.

References

External links 

 
 
 
 
 Agatha Christie's Poirot  on SonyLIV

1989 British television series debuts
2013 British television series endings
1980s British crime drama television series
1980s British mystery television series
1990s British crime drama television series
1990s British mystery television series
2000s British crime drama television series
2000s British mystery television series
2010s British crime drama television series
2010s British mystery television series
A&E (TV network) original programming
British detective television series
Poirot
Hercule Poirot
ITV mystery shows
London Weekend Television shows
Television shows based on works by Agatha Christie
Television series by ITV Studios
Television series produced at Pinewood Studios
Television series set in the 1930s
English-language television shows